Saint Díchu mac Trichim was the first convert of Saint Patrick in Ireland. His feast is noted in the Martyrology of Donegal as "Diochu of Sabhall", under date of 29 April.

See also

References

5th-century Christian saints
Medieval Irish saints
5th-century Irish people
People from County Down